Thomas L. "Moe" Barr (born June 19, 1947) is a retired American basketball player. He played collegiately for the Duquesne University.

Barr played for the Cincinnati Royals (1970–71) in the NBA for 31 games.

Barr is now a high school and collegiate referee of volleyball in Pittsburgh, Pennsylvania.

External links

1947 births
Living people
Basketball players from Pittsburgh
Cincinnati Royals players
Duquesne Dukes men's basketball players
Shooting guards
Undrafted National Basketball Association players
American men's basketball players